Marta Bertoglio is an American politician and real estate broker serving as a member of the Montana House of Representatives from the 75th district. Elected in November 2020, she assumed office on January 4, 2021.

Early life and education 
Marta Bertoglio was born in Deer Lodge, Montana, in 1969. She earned a Bachelor of Science in political science and government from the United States Air Force Academy in 1991.

Career 
Bertoglio served as a United States Air Force officer for 20 years, including in the Air Force Reserve Command, as a space operations officer. After retiring, she returned to Montana and began working as a real estate agent. Bertoglio defeated incumbent Republican Greg DeVries in the 2020 primary election, and was elected to the Montana House of Representatives in November 2020.

References 

Living people
United States Air Force Academy alumni
Republican Party members of the Montana House of Representatives
Women state legislators in Montana
1969 births
21st-century American women